Christopher Michael Pettit (born August 15, 1984) is an American former professional baseball outfielder who played in Major League Baseball (MLB) for the Los Angeles Angels of Anaheim in 2009 and 2011.

Amateur career
Pettit was born in Pasadena, California. He attended San Dimas High School, where he graduated from in 2002, after being named both 2002 Male Scholar-Athlete of the Year and Best Body (male).

He attended Loyola Marymount University, and in 2005 he played collegiate summer baseball with the Orleans Cardinals of the Cape Cod Baseball League.

Professional career

Los Angeles Angels of Anaheim
Pettit was selected by the Los Angeles Angels of Anaheim in the 19th round (582nd overall) of the 2006 Major League Baseball Draft. In September 2009, he was called up to the Los Angeles Angels and made his major league debut. In his first major league at bat, Pettit singled in the seventh inning, and later scored on a Howie Kendrick double. He appeared in 10 games for the Angels in 2009, and had 2 hits in 7 at-bats.

Pettit missed the entire 2010 season following shoulder surgery. In 2011, he appeared in only one game in the majors, appearing as a pinch runner on April 8 against the Toronto Blue Jays. He spent the rest of the season split between the Salt Lake Bees and the Arkansas Travelers, where he hit a combined .182 in 124 games.  On January 20, 2012, he was released.

Los Angeles Dodgers
On January 31, he signed a minor league contract with the Los Angeles Dodgers. He was released on March 29. He later signed with the Bridgeport Bluefish of the Atlantic league of professional baseball, before signing a minor league contract with the Seattle Mariners on April 20. He was released again and on July 26, he signed a minor league contract with the Colorado Rockies.

Baltimore Orioles
On January 30, 2013, he signed a minor league contract with the Baltimore Orioles.

Tigres de Quintana Roo
On April 23, 2013 he signed a contract with the Tigres de Quintana Roo playing in the Mexican Baseball League.

References

External links

"The 10 Least Consequential Athletes of the Decade" by Jon Bois, for SB Nation

1984 births
Living people
American expatriate baseball players in Mexico
Arizona League Angels players
Arkansas Travelers players
Baseball players from California
Bowie Baysox players
Cedar Rapids Kernels players
Colorado Springs Sky Sox players
Jackson Generals (Southern League) players
Los Angeles Angels players
Loyola Marymount Lions baseball players
Major League Baseball outfielders
Mexican League baseball center fielders
New Britain Rock Cats players
Orem Owlz players
Orleans Firebirds players
People from San Dimas, California
Rancho Cucamonga Quakes players
Salt Lake Bees players
Tigres de Quintana Roo players
Tulsa Drillers players